Bischofsgrün is a municipality in the district of Bayreuth in Bavaria in Germany.

Bischofsgrün is situated within the Fichtelgebirge mountain range between the range's two largest mountains; Schneeberg (1051 m) and the Ochsenkopf (1024 m). The Ochsenkopf North Chairlift starts in Bischofsgrün and is one of two chair lifts that climb to the summit of the Ochsenkopf, making the town an ideal location for outdoor recreation year round. During the winter months tourists flock to the area for alpine skiing, cross country skiing, and sledding.  During the summer, mountain biking and hiking are popular.

Bischofsgrün is supposedly the town where the art of glassblowing became a true industry. Glassblowing is no longer a necessity, but Bischofsgrün has become something of a tourist attraction, not for its growth but for its lack of it. While it does have some bucolic resorts set into foothills, it also still has a few farms, at least one microbrewery, and some impressive stone churches.

Bischofsgrün is located on White Main and is the starting point of the White Main branch of the Main-Radweg bicycle path which stretches about 600 km along the Main river until the mouth into the Rhine.

Notable people 
 Henrik Ohlmeyer, German ski jumper

Partner towns 
  Krásno, Czech Republic

References

Bayreuth (district)